The 1993–94 Greek Football Cup was the 52nd edition of the Greek Football Cup.

Tournament details

Totally 72 teams participated, 18 from Alpha Ethniki, 18 from Beta, and 36 from Gamma. It was held in 6 rounds, included final.

It was a very interesting competition with undecided matches and led in a Final between Panathinaikos and AEK Athens, a pair that had not appeared in a Greek Cup Final for 45 years, since the last confrontation between the two teams in the final match was in 1949. AEK Athens qualified in the Final after 11 years, while Panathinaikos had eliminated PAOK earlier in penalty shootout, after two goalless draws.

The final match was the one of two more shocking Finals in history of Greek Cup, after the Final of 1976. Panathinaikos preceded 2–0 and appeared to win, however, in a few minutes to its end, AEK Athens accomplished to draw, to precede in the start of extra time and to be drawn, in order finally to lose the Cup in penalty shootout. At the same time they lost The Double, while the same year they won the last championship in their history, until 2009.

Remarkable in the competition was also the bombardment of goals, almost in all phases and mainly in second legs. Characteristically, in second matches of Second Round, 16 in the number, were marked 64 goals, mean 4 goals per match, and in corresponding of Third Round 30 goals in 8 matches.

Also, it is remarkable that in unique two from 16 groups that included two Alpha Ethniki teams, it happened to be drawn opponents Olympiacos and Iraklis in Group 16, that later balloted again in quarter-finals, but also AEK Athens and Panathinaikos in Group 14, that is to say the pair of the Final.

Calendar

Group stage

The phase was played in a single round-robin format. Each win would gain 3 points, each draw 1 and each loss would not gain any point.

Group 1

Group 2

Group 3

Group 4

Group 5

Group 6

Group 7

Group 8

Group 9

Group 10

Group 11

Group 12

Group 13

Group 14

Group 15

Group 16

Knockout phase
Each tie in the knockout phase, apart from the final, was played over two legs, with each team playing one leg at home. The team that scored more goals on aggregate over the two legs advanced to the next round. If the aggregate score was level, the away goals rule was applied, i.e. the team that scored more goals away from home over the two legs advanced. If away goals were also equal, then extra time was played. The away goals rule was again applied after extra time, i.e. if there were goals scored during extra time and the aggregate score was still level, the visiting team advanced by virtue of more away goals scored. If no goals were scored during extra time, the winners were decided by a penalty shoot-out. In the final, which were played as a single match, if the score was level at the end of normal time, extra time was played, followed by a penalty shoot-out if the score was still level.The mechanism of the draws for each round is as follows:
There are no seedings, and teams from the same group can be drawn against each other.

Bracket

Round of 32

|}

Round of 16

|}

Quarter-finals

|}

Semi-finals

|}

Final

The 50th Greek Cup Final was played at the Olympic Stadium.

References

External links
Greek Cup 1993-94 at RSSSF

Greek Football Cup seasons
Greek Cup
Cup